HBV may refer to:
 Buskerud and Vestfold University College
 Hamengkubuwono V, 19th-century ruler of Yogyakarta, Java
 Handbuch der Vögel Mitteleuropas (Handbook of the Birds of Central Europe)
 HBV hydrology model
 Hepatitis B virus
 Hepatitis B vaccine
 Heterostructure barrier varactor
 Trade, Banking and Insurance Union, a former German trade union